Atul Pradhan is an Indian politician of the Samajwadi Party. He is a member of the 18th Uttar Pradesh Assembly, representing the Sardhana (Assembly constituency).

References 

1983 births
Living people
Samajwadi Party politicians
Uttar Pradesh MLAs 2022–2027
People from Meerut district